Samina Hussein is a Nepalese politician, belonging to the Communist Party of Nepal (Unified Socialist) currently serving as the member of the 1st Federal Parliament of Nepal. In the 2017 Nepalese general election she was elected as a proportional representative from the Muslim category.

References

Nepal MPs 2017–2022
Living people
Communist Party of Nepal (Unified Socialist) politicians
Nepalese Muslims
Communist Party of Nepal (Unified Marxist–Leninist) politicians
1981 births